Edmonton Rugby Foot-ball Club was an early Canadian football - rugby union team based in Edmonton, Alberta.  The team was founded in 1907 as the Edmonton Rugby Foot-ball Club, but football had been played in the city and environs for nearly 2 decades. The first game in Alberta was played in Edmonton, with Edmonton and Clover Bar (an outlying community, now a suburb) playing to a scoreless tie in 1890. "The first record of an organized rugby club in Edmonton appeared in the Edmonton bulletin on September 19, 1891." In 1891 Edmonton defeated Calgary 6-5 in the Alberta Total-point Challenge Series. A team from Edmonton (actually the outlying community of Fort Saskatchewan) had a picture taken of themselves after they defeated a Calgary team (in Calgary,) declaring themselves Champions of Alberta; the picture has two dates on it, being taken in either 1893 or 1895.  

The team is neither affiliated with the current franchise, the Edmonton Elks (also previously nicknamed Eskimos), nor forms part of its history.

"The Edmonton Rugby Foot-ball Club was formed on April 10, 1907 and adopted the uniform colors of black with yellow facings. Edmonton played its first game on November 9 and defeated the Calgary City Rugby Foot-ball Club 26-5 at the Edmonton Exhibition Grounds."  The club was renamed the Edmonton Esquimaux in 1908 and again as the Edmonton Eskimos in 1910. They competed in the Alberta Rugby Football League and later Alberta Rugby Football Union (AFRU) when it was created in 1911. In the years before and after the First World War the city was represented by the Edmonton Civics in 1914 and the Edmonton Canucks in 1919.

The Edmonton Eskimos were AFRU and WCFRU champions in 1921, earning the right to compete for the Grey Cup in the 9th Grey Cup championship game – the first time for a Western Canadian team – losing 23–0 to the undefeated Toronto Argonauts.  The team was renamed the Edmonton Elks in 1922 and represented the WCFRU in the 10th Grey Cup, losing 13–1 to the Queen's University Golden Gaels.

The team changed back to the name Eskimos for the 1923 season, winning their third consecutive AFRU championship but failing to clinch the WCFRU championship. The Eskimos did not win the 1924 AFRU championship, and folded before the 1925 season.

The Eskimos team returned for the 1928 season, winning the ARFU or ARFL championship for the seventh time in 14 seasons of competition. Their last season was 1929, when the team was succeeded by a new club called the Edmonton Boosters. The Boosters folded after 3 season, and were later followed by the Edmonton Hi-Grads in 1936 (a team of high school graduate all-stars) and then yet another incarnation of the Eskimos, a team lasting two seasons (1938 and 1939) before ceasing operation as the Second World War began.

Seasons

Other Edmonton football clubs

References

Defunct Canadian football teams
Rugby clubs established in 1907
Rug
1907 establishments in Alberta
1920s disestablishments in Alberta
Sports clubs disestablished in 1929